Debendra Nath Karjee  is an Indian politician. He was elected from Cooch Behar, West Bengal to the Lok Sabha, lower house of the Parliament of India as a member of the Forward Bloc.

References

External links
Official biographical sketch in Parliament of India website

India MPs 1962–1967
Lok Sabha members from West Bengal
People from Cooch Behar district
1904 births
1963 deaths
People from West Bengal